Women in Music was an American newsletter founded in July 1935 by its publisher and editor, Frédérique Petrides, then the conductor of the Orchestrette Classique – an orchestra based in New York made-up of female musicians. The publication ran until December 1940. The thirty-seven extant issues were reprinted in the 1991 book by Jan Bell Groh, Evening the Score: Women in Music and the Legacy of Frédérique Petrides. The newsletter title Women in Music was coined in 1935 by Petrides's husband, journalist, Peter Petrides to encapsulate the gist of its contents.

History 
Women in Music was founded in the summer of 1935 for the purpose of enlightening the public with little-known historical facts and current developments pertaining to female conductors, composers, instrumentalists, singers and women-led orchestras. Its scope was not limited to contemporary musicians – it chronicled the activities of female musicians from Ancient Egyptian times to the then present.

The publication was sent free-of-charge to newspaper and magazine editors, libraries, music schools, institutions, and individuals in New York and elsewhere. The publication had a circulation of over 2,500.

Major print media, including music journals, general magazines, and newspapers have cited Women in Music as a primary source for opinions, facts, and quotes. Some of the newspapers include The New York Times; The New York Sun; New York World-Telegram; New York Daily News; New York Post; The Baltimore Sun; Chicago Tribune; San Diego Union; Los Angeles Times; Press-Telegram; The Philadelphia Inquirer, and publications that drew articles from Everybody's Weekly syndication.

"The Women in Music newsletters are the primary source for research done by musicologists on women in music." — Adrienne Fried Block, PhD (1921–2009), musicologist and choral director

Extant issues 
Published by “Orchestrette Classique,” 190 East End Ave., New York City

 Volume I July 1, 1935Oscar Thompson, Rebecca Merit (Merritt), Hubay and Flesch, Ethel Leginska, Henry Holden Huss
 Vol. I, No. 2 August 1935Fadettes, Caroline B. Nichols, Gertrud Hrdliczka, Eva Vale Anderson, Long Beach Woman's Symphony, Carmen Studer
 Vol. I, No. 3 September 1935Thomas B. Aldrich, Gustave A. Kerker, Musical Mutual Protective Union of New York, Dr. Charles Burney, “Outline of a Prejudice”, Ebba Violette, Irene Sundstrom, Murielle and Portland Women's Symphony, Nikolai Sokoloff
 Vol. I, No. 4 November 1935Women's String Orchestra, Camilla Urso, Lois Wann, Emma Steiner, Hans Kindler, Jeanette Evrard, Sandor Harmati, Woman's Symphony of Chicago (Chicago Woman's Symphony Orchestra), Arthur P. Schmidt, Eleanor Warner Everest Freer
 Vol. I, No. 5 December 1935Luisa Tetrazini, Herliczka, Teresa Carreno, Henry T. Finck, Dame Ethel Smyth, Pauline Viardot-Garcia, Maud Powell, Jenny Lind  
 Vol. I, No. 6. February 1936Caroline B. Nichols,  Julia Smith, Antonia Brico, New York Women's Symphony, Harley Hamilton, Woman's Orchestra of Los Angeles, D. Cesar Cianfoni
 Vol. I, No. 7 March 1936Sir Henry Wood, Marie Wilson, New York Ladies Ensemble, Musicians’ Union, Atlantic Garden Orchestra, Women's Little Symphony of Cleveland
 Vol. I, No. 8 May 1936Long Beach (group), Gertrud Herliczka
 Vol. II, No. 1 July 1936Stokowski, Girl Scout, Long Beach Woman's Symphony, Eva Anderson, Pittsburgh Woman's Symphony, Lady Folkestone, Grace Burrows, British Women's Symphony Orchestra
 Vol. II, No. 2 August 1936Bembo, Leopold Stokowski, Philadelphia Women's Symphony
 Vol. II, No. 3 November 1936Elizabeth Kuyper, Billboard, Jeannette Scheerer, Gena Branscombe, Jane Evrard
 Vol. II, No. 4 January 1937Vienna Ladies Orchestra, Phil Spitalny, Evelyn (Spitalny), Ethel Bartlett, Rae Robertson, William Durieux, Long Beach (group)
 Vol. II, No. 5 February 1937Georges Enesco, Ellen Stone, Carmelita Ippolito, Frederick Huber
 Vol. II, No. 6 March 1937Jose Iturbi
 Vol. II, No. 7 April 1937Jose Iturbi, British Woman's Symphony Orchestra, Helen Enser, Carmen Studer Weingartner
 Vol. II, No. 8 June 1937Olga Samaroff, National Federation of Music Clubs, Berlin Women's Orchestra, Elizabeth Kuyper, Mathilde Ernestine, Federal Music Project, Works Progress Administration (WPA)
 Vol. III, No. 1 July 1937William J. Henderson, Caroline B. Nichols, Louis Elson, Ruth Kemper, Commonwealth Women's Orchestra of Boston (WPA), Nino Marcelli’s San Diego Symphony, Lela Hammer, Woods Symphony Orchestra, Lois Wann, Virginia Payton
 Vol. III, No. 2 September 1937Albert Roussel, Ebba Sundstrom, Herliczka, The New Yorker, Virginia Short, Chicago Women's Concert Band, Lillian Poenisch
 Vol. III, No. 3 October 15, 1937Anne (or Anna) Mehlig Falk, George Schaun
 Vol. III, No. 4 December 1937Sidney Lanier, Otto Klemperer,  Saint Louis Women's Orchestra, Edith Gordon
 Vol. III, No. 5 January 1938Fabien Sevitzsky, Bertha Roth Walburn Clark,  Erno Rapee
 Vol. III, No. 6 February 1938Leona May Smith, Nadia Boulanger, Walter Damrosch
 Vol. III, No. 7 April 1938Gertrude Herliczka, Lonny Epstein, Carl Friedberg, Grace Kleinhenn Thompson Edmister, Kirsten Flagstad
 Vol. III, No. 8 June 1, 1938Leopold Stokowski, Hans Kindler, Sidney Lanier, Musicians Union - local 802, Committee for Recognition of Women in the Musical Profession, Musical America, Serge Koussevitzky, Frederick Huber, William J. Henderson
 Vol. IV, No. 1 July 1938Ethel Leginska, Teresa Carreno, Gladys Weige, Woman's Symphony of Chicago, Fanny Arnston-Hassler, Woman's Concert Ensemble
 Vol. IV, No. 2 September 1938Ruth Kemper, Howard Barlow
 Vol. IV, No. 3 October 1938Pauline Juler
 Vol. IV, No. 4 December 1938Nadia Boulanger, Lonny Epstein, Edgar Carver's all-girl band, John C. Freund, Marian Anderson, William J. King, The New York City Federation of Women's Clubs, Mrs. Otto Hahn, Julia Smith
 Vol. IV, No. 5 January 1939Nadia Boulanger, Brico Symphony, Billboard, Eleven Debutantes, Henriette Weber
 Vol. IV, No. 6 March 1939Asger Hamerik, Nadia Boulanger
 Vol. IV, No. 7 April 15, 1939Alicia Hund, Amy Fay, Hetty Turnbull, Albert Stoessel, Louise Angelique Bertin, Paul Creston
 Vol. V, No. 1 November 1939David Diamond
 Vol. V, No. 2 December 1939Izler Solomon, Ruth Haroldson, Heidi Sundblad-Halme, Alexander Richter
 Vol. V, No.3 February 1940Erika Morini, Amy Marcy (Cheney) Beach, Elsa Hilger, Deems Taylor, Sophie Hutchinson Drinker, Drinker Library of Choral Music
 Vol. V, No. 4 April 1940World's Center for Women's Archives, Inc.
 Vol. V, No. 5 September 1940Stokowski, All-American Youth Orchestra
 Vol. VI, No. 1 December 1940Caroline B. Nichols, Orchestrette Classique, Women in Music

Bibliography

Footnotes

References

External links
 Women in Music, July 1, 1935 issue

Music magazines published in the United States
Defunct women's magazines published in the United States
Magazines established in 1935
Magazines disestablished in 1940
Music newsletters
Women in music
Feminist magazines
Magazines published in New York City